Karanchira is a small village in Thrissur district of Kerala, South India. This hamlet is surrounded by a river(Karivannur River) and green fields, and is a part of the Mukundapuram parliament constituency. Kattoor is nearest place to karanchira . 

Karanchira has a multi specialty hospital - The Bishop Alapatt Hospital. Expatriates are the backbone of the economy. Agriculture is the source of income for a substantial minority.

References

Villages in Thrissur district